The 2017 Judo Grand Prix Antalya was held at the Antalya Arena Sports Hall in Antalya, Turkey, from 7 to 9 April 2017.

Medal summary

Men's events

Women's events

Source Results

Medal table

References

External links
 

2017 IJF World Tour
2017 Judo Grand Prix
Judo
Grand Prix 2017
Judo